Nikos Sergianopoulos (29 January 1958 – 4 June 2008), surname also spelled as Seryanopoulos or Seryiannopoulos, was a Greek actor.

Early life and career
Born in Drama, Greece, he graduated from the State Theater of Northern Greece (ΚΘΒΕ) and was a founding member of the Piramatiki Skini Tehnis artwork club in Thessaloniki. He took part in numerous theatrical and television productions and gained recognition for his role in the popular television series of Mega Channel Dyo Xenoi (1997–98).

Death
Sergianopoulos  was found murdered in his apartment on the morning of 4 June 2008, in Pagkrati, a central district  of Athens. According to police evidence he was a victim of homicide, suffering a total of twenty-one stab wounds. His apartment was found in disarray and the number of beer bottles and drinks glasses at the scene suggested Sergianopoulos had visitors the previous day. His front door was not damaged; a fact that suggests that the murderers already knew the victim and had entered with his consent. Police believe the attack was carried out by two people. The fact that Sergianopoulos had been arrested for drug possession in the Kolonos area in December 2007 may be related to the murder.

Relatives, as well as colleagues and local people, attended his funeral on 6 June 2008, in his hometown, Drama.

A Georgian native was arrested on 26 July in Kolonos and subsequently confessed to the murder. He stated that he had attacked Sergianopoulos after his rejection of the actor's advances turned violent. The man was charged with premeditated murder, robbery, weapon possession and illegal entry into Greece.

The murderer of Sergianopoulos, would be released from prison in 2023, because he would complete 15 years of his imprisonment. However, on June 26, 2021, after a fight in the prison, he stabbed a fellow prisoner and killed him.

References

External links

Actor N. Sergianopoulos Murdered, ERT Online, June 4, 2008
Greek police investigates actor's murder, Wikinews, June 6, 2008

1952 births
2008 deaths
People from Drama, Greece
Deaths by stabbing in Greece
Greek male film actors
Greek murder victims
Greek male stage actors
Greek male television actors
People murdered in Greece
2008 murders in Greece